Horsfieldia montana is a species of plant in the family Myristicaceae. It is a tree endemic to Borneo.
The Latin specific epithet montana refers to mountains or coming from mountains.

References

montana
Endemic flora of Borneo
Trees of Borneo
Near threatened flora of Asia
Taxonomy articles created by Polbot